Isoleucine (symbol Ile or I) is an α-amino acid that is used in the biosynthesis of proteins. It contains an α-amino group (which is in the protonated −NH form under biological conditions), an α-carboxylic acid group (which is in the deprotonated −COO form under biological conditions), and a hydrocarbon side chain with a branch (a central carbon atom bound to three other carbon atoms). It is classified as a non-polar, uncharged (at physiological pH), branched-chain, aliphatic amino acid. It is essential in humans, meaning the body cannot synthesize it, and must be ingested in our diet. Isoleucine is synthesized from pyruvate employing leucine biosynthesis enzymes in other organisms such as bacteria. It is encoded by the codons AUU, AUC, and AUA.

Metabolism

Biosynthesis 
As an essential nutrient, it is not synthesized in the body, hence it must be ingested, usually as a component of proteins.  In plants and microorganisms,
it is synthesized via several steps, starting from pyruvate and alpha-ketobutyrate.  Enzymes involved in this biosynthesis include:
 Acetolactate synthase (also known as acetohydroxy acid synthase)
 Acetohydroxy acid isomeroreductase
 Dihydroxyacid dehydratase
 Valine aminotransferase

Catabolism 

Isoleucine is both a glucogenic and a ketogenic amino acid. After transamination with alpha-ketoglutarate the carbon skeleton is oxidised and split into propionyl-CoA and acetyl-CoA. Propionyl-CoA is converted into succinyl-CoA, a TCA cycle intermediate which can be converted into oxaloacetate for gluconeogenesis (hence glucogenic). In mammals acetyl-CoA cannot be converted to carbohydrate but can be either fed into the TCA cycle by condensing with oxaloacetate to form citrate or used in the synthesis of ketone bodies (hence ketogenic) or fatty acids.

Insulin resistance 
Isoleucine, like other branched-chain amino acids, is associated with insulin resistance: higher levels of isoleucine are observed in the blood of diabetic mice, rats, and humans. Mice fed an isoleucine deprivation diet for one day have improved insulin sensitivity, and feeding of an isoleucine deprivation diet for one week significantly decreases blood glucose levels. In diet-induced obese and insulin resistant mice, a diet with decreased levels of isoleucine (with or without the other branched-chain amino acids) results in reduced adiposity and improved insulin sensitivity. Reduced dietary levels of isoleucine are required for the beneficial metabolic effects of a low protein diet. In humans, a protein restricted diet lowers blood levels of isoleucine and decreases fasting blood glucose levels. In humans, higher dietary levels of isoleucine are associated with greater body mass index.

Functions and requirement
The Food and Nutrition Board (FNB) of the U.S. Institute of Medicine has set Recommended Dietary Allowances (RDAs) for essential amino acids in 2002. For isoleucine, for adults 19 years and older, 19 mg/kg body weight/day is required.

Beside its biological role as a nutrient, Isoleucine also has been shown to participate in regulation of glucose metabolism.

Nutritional sources 
Even though this amino acid is not produced in animals, it is stored in high quantities. Foods that have high amounts of isoleucine include eggs, soy protein, seaweed, turkey, chicken, lamb, cheese, and fish.

Isomers

Synthesis
Isoleucine can be synthesized in a multistep procedure starting from 2-bromobutane and diethylmalonate. Synthetic isoleucine was originally reported in 1905 by French chemist Louis Bouveault.

German chemist Felix Ehrlich discovered isoleucine in hemoglobin in 1903.

References

External links 
 Isoleucine and valine biosynthesis

Proteinogenic amino acids
Glucogenic amino acids
Ketogenic amino acids
Branched-chain amino acids
Essential amino acids
G